A Hangover You Don't Deserve is the fifth studio album by American rock band Bowling for Soup. It was released on September 14, 2004, as their third album with Jive Records. The first single, "1985", quickly became a Top 40 staple, peaking at No. 5 on Billboards Adult Top 40 chart.

Critical reception

Johnny Loftus, writing for AllMusic, praised the catchability of the first three tracks and Jaret Reddick's songwriting on songs like "Ohio (Come Back to Texas)", but was critical of the album containing typical pop punk production ("stuff like piano breaks, compressed vocals, and steppe farm chorus guitars") that made the band sound too close to similar bands like Goldfinger and Lit, saying that "most of the time it's very hard to hear Bowling for Soup around Hangovers radio and video-ready sheen." Entertainment Weekly writer Brian Hiatt felt that tracks like "1985" were not enough to sustain a whole album, saying that, "Like a lower-SATs version of Fountains of Wayne, the Texas quartet tries to write silly/clever lyrics to go atop their high-carb pop melodies. But too much of the humor (rhyming "Miss Texas" with "bigger breast-es"?) functions on a Jackass: The Band level."

Track listing

Each version of the album, excluding the DualDisc version, has a number of tracks that are four to five seconds of complete silence, titled "[Blank]", between the last song and "Ohio (Reprise)". The number of tracks varies upon the version, but "Ohio (Reprise)" and "Belgium (Boy Band Remix)" are tracks 43 and 44 respectively on all versions.

DualDisc versionCD side Tracks 1–17 of standard editionDVD side Entire album in 5.1 Surround Sound (including "Ohio (Reprise)" and "Belgium" (Boy Band Remix) as tracks 18 and 19 respectively)
 Entire album In Stereo PCM
 "1985" (video)
 "Almost" (video)
 "Ridiculous" (video)
 "Two-Seater" (acoustic) (video from RollingStone.com Originals)

B-sides

PersonnelBowling for Soup: Jaret Reddick — lead vocals, rhythm guitar
 Erik Chandler — bass guitar, vocals
 Chris Burney — lead guitar, vocals
 Gary Wiseman — drums, percussionProduction: Co-Produced by Russ-T Cobb and Jaret Reddick except * and **
  Produced by Butch Walker
 Recorded and Mixed at Ruby Red Productions Atlanta, Georgia
 Engineered and mixed by Russ-T Cobb except **
 Assistant Engineer: Sean Loughlin
 Project Coordinator: Christie Priode
  Produced by Jaret Reddick Casey Diiorio
 Recorded and Mixed by Casey Diiorio at Valve Studios, Dallas, Texas
 Tracks 1 and 3 Mixed by Tom Lord-Alge at South Beach Studios, Miami, Florida
 Mastered by Chaz Harper at Battery Mastering NYC
 album photography by Jason JanikAdditional Musicians/Backing Vocals:'
 Butch Walker
 Russ-T Cobb
 Joey Huffman
 FFroe
 Howie
 Sim Klugerman
 Sean Loughlin
 JT Hall
 Shelly Truesdell
 Candice Leigh Andrews
 Sybil Summers as the "ex" in "Down For The Count"

Charts

Weekly charts

Year-end charts

Singles

Certifications

References

External links

 A Hangover You Don't Deserve at YouTube (streamed copy where licensed)

2004 albums
Jive Records albums
Bowling for Soup albums
Albums produced by Butch Walker